"Brogrammer" or "tech bro" are slang terms often used to label a stereotypically masculine programmer. Brogrammer is a portmanteau of bro and programmer. It is often used pejoratively, but some programmers self-describe themselves as a brogrammer positively as a word for "sociable or outgoing programmer", and it also tends to represent a subculture within the greater tech industry. An example sometimes cited of targeted advertising toward "brogrammers" is an early Klout hiring advert posted at a Stanford University career fair as "Want to bro down and crush some code? Klout is hiring." The company later described it as a joke and as an unfortunate misstep.

Brogrammer culture has been said to have created an entry barrier based on adherence to the image presented by its participants, rather than ability. It can be viewed as antithetical to geek culture, which emphasizes ability and passion for field over image.

Effects on participation of women in computing
Articles in The Atlantic have advocated strongly for the importance of an egalitarian tech team. According to research published in Fortune, 27% of women cited workplace culture as a reason for leaving jobs in the technology industry. This is the second most cited reason after motherhood, which was cited by 68% of women. In 2011, the Computing Research Association found that women received 11.7% of computer science bachelor's degrees.

In a 2015 interview, Megan Smith, then-President of the United States Barack Obama's top policy adviser on technology, said to an audience gathered at Capitol Hill that tech companies acknowledge that their hiring of women is less than stellar; however, "despite promises to do better, only those that make it a top priority will see progress." Not only are there biases among men, but there are also biases among women themselves. Studies show that women often underestimate and undervalue their own abilities. One such study exemplifies this by giving men and women a list of criteria that they have to meet in order to apply for a job, and results show that, out of 10 characteristics required for a job, men will usually apply if they meet three of those criteria, while women will only apply if they meet at least seven. "So biases will just be part of any decision we make. One of the big research fields right now is how to mitigate bias, and there are software tools being created and other things that can help address this challenge."

In a dissenting article in Gizmodo, Sam Biddle argues that the sexist effect of the brogrammer culture has actually been overblown by the press. He does not deny that there are "brogrammers", rather he argues that "the brogrammer as phenomenon is mythology, a fairytale figure conjured up by the confused and outmoded to explain progress in an old and stodgy industry." Whether or not the "brogrammer effect" is significant, many new initiatives have arisen that seek to promote women in computer science and counter hostile culture. Initiatives such as We Can Code IT, Women Who Code and Made with Code and Femgineer serve to support a diverse community, often working to encourage women to join STEM fields from a young age. Another organization, Wogrammer, is a play of the slang brogrammer, and highlights the accomplishments of women in technology.

Political alignment
People labelled tech bros often have strong support for free speech, rejecting the use of censorship even on misinformation and hate speech. Tech bros are often seen as libertarian, with close ties to hacker culture and technolibertarianism. In the American political system this does not fit neatly into the two major parties. The term has been used on the Democratic primary candidate Andrew Yang, Republican large donor Peter Thiel, and alt-right thinker Curtis Yarvin.

Due to the label being applied to increasingly broader demographics, including those without a clear tie to the technology industry and across the political spectrum, it has been suggested that the term has lost its meaning and only distracts the conversation.

See also
 Corporate culture
 Sexism in the technology industry
 Brogrammer (The sportswear brand)

References

Further reading 
 
 
 
 
 
 

Computer programming folklore
2010s neologisms